American Heritage University of Southern California (AHUSC) is a for-profit college based in Southern California.

American Heritage University states that it was founded in 2003 and is incorporated in the State of California under the name Heritage University.

Degree Programs
The university is structured into two Schools: The School of Business Management and the School of Law. The following degree programs are offered:

The School of Business Management has two (2) programs:
 Bachelor of Business Administration (BBA).
 Master of Business Administration (MBA)

The School of Law has two (2) programs:
 Bachelor of Science in Law (BSL).
 Juris Doctor (JD)

Its student pool consists largely of working adults. The school is located in Ontario, California, where local students may attend classes on weekends at the school campus for in-class sessions. They also have online live interactive lectures and archived recorded lectures.

The university has a local and international student body with six affiliate campuses in Asia, Europe, Middle East and Africa. AHUSC has open enrollment admission policy. It confers degrees, certificates, and diplomas in a range of courses in Business Management and Law. Though the school requires a minimum of 60 credit units to be admitted for its programs, it provides degree applicants the opportunity for advanced placement through Experiential Learning Assessment. It is approved by the California Bureau for Private Postsecondary Education to offer bachelor's degrees in film studies, business administration, and law; master's degrees in public policy and business administration; law degrees (J.D.); and a doctor of business administration degree. This is not the same as accreditation as the Bureau is not an accrediting organization.

Law Program
American Heritage law school graduates are eligible to receive a Juris Doctor (J.D.) law degree. The distance-learning law program of American Heritage is not approved by the American Bar Association or accredited by the California Committee of Bar Examiners. American Heritage is registered with the State Bar of California Committee of Bar Examiners (CBE) as a distance-learning law school. Accordingly, after their first year of law studies, law students from American Heritage are required to pass the California "First-Year Law Students Examination" (Baby Bar) in order to proceed to the more advanced law courses. Upon graduation from the JD program, American Heritage University students will be eligible to take the California General Bar Examination and, upon passing, can  practice law in California.

Baby Bar Examination Passage Rate
As of the October 2015 Examination, a total of 45 American Heritage University law students (From June 2011 through October 2015) had taken the Baby Bar and 10 student passed which gives them a passage rate of 22.22%. 

Source: http://admissions.calbar.ca.gov/Examinations/Statistics.aspx

General Bar Examination Passage Rate

As of the October 2015 Examination, a total of 22 American Heritage University law students (From February 2013 through October 2015) had taken the General Bar Examination and 9 student passed which gives them a passage rate of 41%.

Source: http://admissions.calbar.ca.gov/Examinations/Statistics.aspx

See also
 List of colleges and universities in California

References

External links
 

Educational institutions established in 2003
Distance education institutions based in the United States
For-profit universities and colleges in the United States
Private universities and colleges in California
2003 establishments in California